Ruth Emmanuella Davies (born 24 March 1965), known professionally as Rudi Davies, is an English actress, the daughter of Alan Sharp (1934–2013) and the writer, Dame Beryl Bainbridge (1932–2010).

Career

Davies began her acting career as Penny Lewis in the BBC school drama, Grange Hill. She appeared there from 1979 to 1982. She did not return for Series 4, due to filming Forever Young. Her character was written out, stated to have had a horse riding accident offscreen. She reappeared, alongside the rest of the original cast, in a single episode of Series 5.

She appeared opposite David Thewlis in Resurrected (1989), and appeared in A Sense of Guilt. She later was cast in The Object of Beauty (1991) alongside John Malkovich and Andie MacDowell which received a lukewarm reception from critics, and the 1995 film Frankie Starlight.

Davies is married to actor and writer Mick Ford.

Filmography

References

External links
 

1965 births
Living people
English television actresses
Place of birth missing (living people)